Fire with Fire is a 2012 American action thriller film directed by David Barrett starring Josh Duhamel, Bruce Willis, Vincent D'Onofrio and Rosario Dawson. Duhamel plays a firefighter forced to confront an Antitheist neo-Nazi murderer. The film was released direct-to-video on DVD and Blu-ray on November 6, 2012.

Plot
Following a grueling day of work, Long Beach, California firefighter Jeremy Thomas Coleman and his coworkers contemplate ending the day with a case of 15-year-old Scotch whisky. Jeremy enters a convenience store to buy snacks, but is interrupted by David Hagan, an Aryan Brotherhood crime boss. He accuses the store owner of refusing to sell his store which Hagan wants to further his criminal enterprise. The store owner says he buys protection from the Eastside Crips and the store is in their territory so it wouldn't be useful for Hagan's purposes.

Hagan kills the store owner's son and then the store owner. Jeremy narrowly escapes. Police detective Mike Cella, whose former partner was murdered by Hagan while they pursued him in a different case, sees an opportunity to bring Hagan to justice. Hagan is detained and put into a police lineup. Hagan, sure that Jeremy is behind the two-way mirror, recites Jeremy's full name, address and Social Security number.

Before the trial, Jeremy agrees to enter the witness protection program, and changes his last name to Douglas. He leaves the fire department and is moved to New Orleans. Although Jeremy finds it difficult to cope with the loss of his career, he finds consolation in his budding romance with Talia Durham, a Deputy United States Marshal assigned to his case. Later, Hagan's attorney, Harold Gethers, arranges for him to be released from prison in the weeks leading up to the trial. As a result, Jeremy and Talia find their lives in jeopardy when two of Hagan's hitmen ambush them; though Talia is wounded, Jeremy mortally wounds one man, forcing them to retreat. Hagan calls Jeremy, threatening to kill everyone he loves whether he testifies or not. Jeremy vows to kill Hagan first and abandons the witness protection program.

Jeremy returns home to Long Beach, where he seeks out the Eastside Crips to buy an untraceable weapon. Jeremy stakes out one of Hagan's hiding places and kills three of his men. He leaves behind fingerprints but the police can not identify him because his identity is protected by his WITSEC status. Cella figures that Jeremy is behind the deaths. Jeremy grows bolder. He identifies the location of one of Hagan's buildings and tortures one of Hagan's men, who directs him to Gethers. Gethers, who only works for Hagan out of fear, gives Jeremy the location of an abandoned building where Hagan will be that night.

Talia arrives at Long Beach and tries to convince Jeremy to abandon his plan. Jeremy locks Talia in the bathroom and gets away, but Hagan's hitman arrives soon after and kidnaps Talia. That night, Jeremy, using his firefighting knowledge, sets ablaze the building where Hagan and his men are meeting, killing Hagan's men. When Jeremy realizes Talia is also in the building, he puts on his fireman's suit and enters the building to rescue her. Talia manages to break free of her bonds and kills Hagan's hitman in revenge as he attempts to flee the blaze. Jeremy runs into Hagan inside the burning building and, after a struggle, Talia kills Hagan. Jeremy leaves the building with Talia. In the aftermath, Cella, while conversing with the district attorney, states that no evidence was left behind at the burnt building to charge anyone with the deaths of Hagan and his men. Cella is seen putting away a photo of him and his old partner.

Cast

Release
Fire with Fire was released direct-to-video in the United States on November 6, 2012. As of November 11, 2022, Fire with Fire grossed $2,500,277 in the United Arab Emirates, Italy, South Africa, Portugal, Belgium, the United Kingdom, Mexico, Brazil, Peru, Colombia, Malaysia, and Hong Kong. It also made $2,360,170 in domestic sales on home video.

Reception
Rotten Tomatoes, a review aggregator, reports that 7% of 14 surveyed critics gave the film a positive review; the average rating was 3.3/10. Mark Adams of Screen Daily wrote that it is a misfire with a story that is "more silly than exciting".  Tom Huddleston of Time Out London rated it 3/5 stars and called it "a sturdy, unambitious but thoroughly watchable action thriller."  Nathan Rabin of The A.V. Club wrote that it "could be a lot worse" and "is cheesy but moderately effective."  Paul Bradshaw of Total Film rated it 3/5 stars and called it a "daft, generic revenger".  Olly Richards of Empire rated it 1/5 stars and wrote, "Avoid like the plague. The nasty Bubonic kind."  Henry Barnes of The Guardian rated it 1/5 stars and called it too violent and clichéd.  Tyler Foster of DVD Talk rated it 3.5/5 stars and said that it gives its demographic exactly what they want but no more.  Gordon Sullivan of DVD Verdict called it a clichéd, mediocre B movie.

See also

 Bruce Willis filmography

References

External links
 
 

2012 films
2012 direct-to-video films
2012 action thriller films
2012 independent films
American action thriller films
American crime thriller films
American direct-to-video films
2010s English-language films
Films about firefighting
Direct-to-video action films
Films set in Long Beach, California
Films set in Los Angeles
Films set in New Orleans
Aryan Brotherhood
Crips
American vigilante films
MoviePass Films films
American films about revenge
2010s vigilante films
Films about witness protection
2012 directorial debut films
2010s American films